The Crystal River Formation is a geologic formation in Florida. It preserves fossils dating back to the Paleogene period.

See also 

 List of fossiliferous stratigraphic units in Florida

References 

 

Geologic formations of Alabama
Geologic formations of Florida
Oligocene Series of North America
Paleogene Alabama
Paleogene Florida
Paleogene stratigraphic units of North America
Limestone formations of the United States